The 1972 Kentucky Derby was the 98th running of the Kentucky Derby. The race took place on May 6, 1972, with 130,564 people in attendance.

	The history behind the run for the roses goes on for many years. The Kentucky Derby is known to be "the most exciting 2 minutes in sports." “When the famers’ Almanac celebrated its 57th anniversary in 1875. Plans were being made to open the now legendary Churchill Downs horse racecourse in Louisville, Kentucky, and the run the very first Kentucky derby. Today the Kentucky Derby run in May on the first Saturday. In the beginning Churchill didn't make any money. “In 1902 a marketing genius named Colonel J. "Matt" Winn." Was chosen “by a local businessman to take the helm of the Downs and have it turn to a profit.” It went through, the Kentucky derbies where hoping at least that was the goal. He then died in 1949. Winn loved his job, which was and still is paid off. Winns successful marketing eventually created “several Derby rituals that have become essential parts of the event. The winners are presented with a gold trophy and a garland of roses. Before the race begins, we, all join in the sinning of, “My Old Kentucky Home.” Winn picked the first Saturday in May because he wanted a good chance for nice weather for Kentucky. “Today the public still enjoys many derby traditions including sipping mint juleps and enjoying “not brown” wearing fancy hats, eating slices of derby-pie as they watched the race. The “Run for The Roses” continues to be uniquely American tradition that is seen by millions of people worldwide.” 
Ron Turcotte was the winning jockey of the 1972 Belmont Stakes Race and the U.S. Triple Crown in 1973. Turcotte’s career started in “Toronto as a hot walker for E.P Taylor’s Winfield’s farm in 1960.” He gained praise in result of his victory with Tom Rolfe in the 1965 Preakness Stakes. In 1973 Turcotte internationally famous when he rode secretariat, to win the first Triple Crown in 25 years.  “Turcotte was North America’s leading stakes- winning jockey in 1972-1973.” He was the first jockey to win back-to-back Kentucky Derbies. This hasn't happened since Jimmy Winkfield in 1902 he “was the first jockey to have won five out of six consecutive Triple Crown Races. Eventually he was voted “the prestigious George Woolf Memorial Jockey Award.” He was “First Thoroughbred racing ever to be appointed a member of the order of Canada. “Turcotte’s career ended in 1978 following a tumble of his horse, Flag of Leyte Gulf at the starts of a race at Belmont Park. He suffered injuries that resulted in Paraplegia.”  He was put into the National Museum of Racing and Hall of Fame, and he was also voted into the New Brunswick Sports Hall of Fame in 1979 he made it into Canada's Sports Hall of Fame. In 1984 he was the first recipient of the Avelino Gomez Memorial Award. The annual given rewards the jockey who is Canadian born raised or even a regular country who made significant contributions to this sport. “In 2015, a statue of secretariat and Turcotte crossing the finish line at Belmont Stakes was unveiled in grand falls New Brunswick, The hometown of Turcotte. 

	“Riva Ridge was a thoroughbred racehorse, The winner of the Kentucky Derby and Belmont Stakes in 1972.” Riva was often remembered as a simple stablemate of Secretariat. He won seventeen out of his thirty starts and two championships. The American Champion Two-Year-Old Male Horse in 71’and The American Older Male Horse in 73’. It was said that “Riva Ridge’s success was largely responsible for saving Meadow Stable from financial ruin. “Riva Ridge and his sire were owned and bred by the Meadow Stable of Christopher Chenery in Doswell Virginia.” The famous Riva Ridge got his name from Penny, Chenery's daughter and John Tweedy her husband. This was in honor of “their favorite ski run at vail, Colorado. In 1971, there was a financial struggle at Meadow Stable. Chenery eventually became very sick and was enabled to keep going. Hs daughter Penny wanted to save it, whereas for her sibling’s they did not, they wanted to sell it. After seeing how successful Riva Ridge was as the two-year-old they decided to keep it. At the ages of two and four Riva Ridge was the winner of the Eclipse Award. Riva Ridge’s main jockey was Ron Turcotte. Some would describe Riva Ridge as “very timid and unassuming.” They said he was the horse who “ran away from other horses.” While racing he gained the nickname “Old Pea Head.” I choose to use these sources because the wiki stub only talks about when it took place, where it took place, how many were there in attendance, the winning horse and jockey and a list of those who participated in the race. I felt this stub could use these sources to expand upon this historic event and a little background information about the winning jockey Ron Turcotte and the winning horse Riva Ridge.

Full results

References

 "Ron Turcotte | Secretariat.com". www.secretariat.com. Retrieved 2021-12-06.

 "Riva Ridge (KY) | National Museum of Racing and Hall of Fame". www.racingmuseum.org. Retrieved 2021-12-06.

Staff, Farmers' Almanac, and Farmers' Almanac Staffhttps://www.farmersalmanac.com/author/fa-admin. “Kentucky Derby Traditions: The History behind the Run for the Roses.” Farmers' Almanac, 10 Mar. 2021, https://www.farmersalmanac.com/the-kentucky-derby 

1972
Kentucky Derby
Derby
Kentucky
Kentucky Derby